The Outworlds: A Starsector Atlas is a 1981 role-playing game supplement for Space Opera published by Fantasy Games Unlimited.

Contents
The Outworlds: A Starsector Atlas is a starsector atlas of the Deneb sector for use with FGU's Space Opera game.

Reception
William A. Barton reviewed The Outworlds: A Starsector Atlas in The Space Gamer No. 46. Barton commented that "If you don't mind paying for the wasted space and you're a SO player or FM to whom the prospect of adventuring on exotic planets such as New Wyoming or Goshlookout is enticing, you may find some points of interest in The Outworlds."

See also
 Deneb Sector

References

Role-playing game supplements introduced in 1981
Space Opera supplements